Seward is an  unincorporated community in western Forsyth County, North Carolina, United States .

References

Unincorporated communities in Forsyth County, North Carolina
Unincorporated communities in North Carolina